Borja Fernández may refer to:

Borja Fernández (footballer, born 1981), Spanish football midfielder
Borja Fernández (footballer, born 1995), Spanish football midfielder
Borja Fernández (skater) (born 1984), professional vert skater
Borja Vidal Fernández Fernández (born 1981), handballer and former basketball player